JK Public School, Humhama is a co-educational English public school in the Humhama area of Srinagar (near International Air Port Road), Jammu and Kashmir, India. The school takes its name from the 'J' and 'K' of Jammu and Kashmir.

History
Founded by Muhammad Yousuf Kuchay the school functions under the direct guidance of a Chairperson. It began as a Class-8 school in March 2000 and specialized in Nursing to Secondary level. The school was then upgraded to a Class-10 school for the 2005–2006 school year.

References

External links
 http://www.jkpschool.com

Schools in Srinagar
2000 establishments in Jammu and Kashmir
Educational institutions established in 2000